Malakeyevo is a rural locality (a selo) and the administrative center of Malakeyevskoye Rural Settlement, Veydelevsky District, Belgorod Oblast, Russia. The population was 825 as of 2010. There are 13 streets.

Geography 
Malakeyevo is located 35 km northeast of Veydelevka (the district's administrative centre) by road. Gritsinin is the nearest rural locality.

References 

Rural localities in Veydelevsky District